Sweden held a general election on 18 September 1994. As of the 2022 election, this was the final time in which the Social Democrats won more than 45% of the overall vote, marking a steady decline thereafter. The Green Party replaced the New Democracy party in the Riksdag, with the seven elected parties being represented in parliament into the 2020s after the Christian Democrats narrowly beat the parliamentary 4% threshold by a mere 3,752 votes.

National results

Regional results

Percentage share

By votes

Constituency results

Percentage share

By votes

Municipal summary

Municipal results

Blekinge

Dalarna

Kopparberg County

Gotland

Gävleborg

Halland

Jämtland

Jönköping

Kalmar

Kronoberg

Norrbotten

Skåne
Skåne was divided into two separate counties at the time. Malmöhus was divided into one covering Malmö Municipality and two covering the northern and southern parts of the county. Kristianstad County was one constituency for the whole county.

Kristianstad

Malmö

Malmöhus N

Malmöhus S

Stockholm

Stockholm (city)

Stockholm County

Södermanland

Uppsala

Värmland

Västerbotten

Västernorrland

Västmanland

Västra Götaland
Västra Götaland did have three different counties at the time. Those were Göteborg och Bohuslän, Skaraborg and Älvsborg. There were five constituencies, namely two for Göteborg och Bohuslän, one for Skaraborg and two for Älvsborg.

Bohuslän

Gothenburg

Skaraborg

Älvsborg N

Älvsborg S

Örebro

Östergötland

References

General elections in Sweden